Justice Danforth may refer to:

Charles Danforth (1815–1890), associate justice of the Maine Supreme Judicial Court
George F. Danforth (1819–1899), judge of the New York Court of Appeals